Hilmar is an unincorporated community in Merced County, California, United States. For census purposes, Hilmar is aggregated with a nearby community into the Hilmar-Irwin census-designated place, which had 5,164 residents as of the 2020 census.

Hilmar began as a colony of Swedish immigrants as early as 1906. The first post office opened in 1920. It is the home of the Hilmar Cheese Company which was founded in 1984 and began production in 1985.  Hilmar has five schools within its district: Elim Elementary, Merquin Elementary, Hilmar Middle School, Hilmar High School, and Irwin Continuation School.

Residents refer to the agricultural area as "Country Living at Its Best", and for people living outside the community, it is referred to as "100 Miles to Anywhere".

Hilmar has the 14th largest community of Portuguese-American people, by percentage of population.  In support of the Portuguese population, there is a Portuguese bakery and fish market, and the high school has a Portuguese club, S.E.C.A., and teaches the Portuguese language.

Hilmar was the southernmost station of the Tidewater Southern Railway. The line terminating in the town was considered the main line of the railroad and was projected to continue south toward Fresno or Bakersfield until the mid-1930s. The line into Hilmar was abandoned in the late 1950s.

References

Unincorporated communities in Merced County, California
Swedish-American culture in California
Unincorporated communities in California